Tecuci County was a county (Romanian: județ) in the Kingdom of Romania, in the historical region Moldavia. The county seat was Tecuci. 

The county was located in the central-eastern part of Greater Romania, in the south of Moldavia. The county bordered on the east with the counties of Tutova and Covurlui, on the south with the county Râmnicu Sărat, and to the west with the counties Putna and Bacău. Because of its shape, its northern extreme was the meeting point of Bacău and Tutova counties.

Administrative organization

The capital of Tecuci County was the town of Tecuci. 

Tecuci County was initially divided administratively into three districts (plăși):
Plasa Homocea, headquartered at Homocea
Plasa Ivești, headquartered at Ivești
Plasa Podu Turcului, headquartered at Podu Turcului

Subsequently, the territory was reorganized into five districts:
Plasa Găiceana, headquartered at Găiceana
Plasa Brăhășești, headquartered at Brăhășești
Plasa Ivești, headquartered at Ivești
Plasa Podu Turcului, headquartered at Podu Turcului 
Plasa Tecuci, headquartered at Tecuci

Population 
According to the 1930 census data, the county population was 156,405 inhabitants, 94.9% were Romanians, 2.0% Gypsies, 1.8% Jews, as well as other minorities. From the religious point of view, 96.3% were Eastern Orthodox, 1.9% were Jewish, 1.6% were Roman Catholic, as well as other minorities.

Urban population 
In 1930, the county's urban population was 17,172 inhabitants, 86.5% Romanians, 8.9% Jews, 1.1% Hungarians, 1.0% Gypsies, 0.8% Germans, as well as other minorities. From the religious point of view, the urban population was composed of 88.3% Eastern Orthodox, 9.2% Jewish, 1.3% Roman Catholic, 0.5% Lutheran, as well as other minorities.

Abolition 
The county was disbanded following the fall of the monarchy in Romania and the coming of Communism. It was divided in September 1950 between Regiunea Putna and Regiunea Bârlad, and in 1952 after the merger of the two, it remained part of Regiunea Bârlad. In 1960, its territory was again divided between Regiunea Bârlad and Regiunea Galați, and since 1968, much of its old territory (including the capital) belonged to Galați County, some smaller areas belonging to today's Vrancea County and Bacău County.

References

External links

  Tecuci County on memoria.ro

Former counties of Romania
1879 establishments in Romania
1938 disestablishments in Romania
1940 establishments in Romania
1950 disestablishments in Romania
States and territories established in 1879
States and territories disestablished in 1938
States and territories established in 1940
States and territories disestablished in 1950